The Villain is a 2009 French comedy film written and directed by and starring Albert Dupontel.

Plot
Sydney Thomas, a gangster nicknamed Le Vilain, decides to hide from the police by going to his mother's. She discovers that he hid from her his "rogue" nature since his childhood and promises to God to make him repent, but Sydney would prefer to kill his mother.

Cast
 Catherine Frot as Maniette Thomas, Sydney's mother
 Albert Dupontel as Sydney Thomas, "le Vilain"
 Bouli Lanners as Nick Korazy
 Nicolas Marié as Doc William
 Bernard Farcy as Inspector Elliot
 Christine Murillo as Carmen Somoza, the Spanish teacher
 Jacqueline Herve as Huguette
 Philippe Duquesne as The redhead painter
 Husky Kihal as The other painter
 Xavier Robic as Korazy's secretary

References

External links
 

2000s French-language films
2009 comedy films
2009 films
French comedy films
Films directed by Albert Dupontel
2000s French films